Cyber resilience refers to an entity's ability to continuously deliver the intended outcome, despite cyber attacks. Resilience to cyber attacks is essential to IT systems, critical infrastructure, business processes, organizations, societies, and nation-states. 

Adverse cyber events are those that negatively impact the availability, integrity, or confidentiality of networked IT systems and associated information and services. These events may be intentional (e.g. cyber attack) or unintentional (e.g. failed software update) and caused by humans, nature, or a combination thereof.

Unlike cyber security, which is designed to protect systems, networks and data from cyber crimes, cyber resilience is designed to prevent systems and networks from being derailed in the event that security is compromised. Cyber security is effective without compromising the usability of systems and there is a robust continuity business plan to resume operations, if the cyber attack is successful.

Cyber resilience helps businesses to recognize that hackers have the advantage of innovative tools, element of surprise, target and can be successful in their attempt. This concept helps business to prepare, prevent, respond and successfully recover to the intended secure state. This is a cultural shift as the organization sees security as a full-time job and embedded security best practices in day-to-day operations. In comparison to cyber security, cyber resilience requires the business to think differently and be more agile on handling attacks.

The objective of cyber resilience is to maintain the entity's ability to deliver the intended outcome continuously at all times. This means doing so even when regular delivery mechanisms have failed, such as during a crisis or after a security breach. The concept also includes the ability to restore or recover regular delivery mechanisms after such events, as well as the ability to continuously change or modify these delivery mechanisms, if needed in the face of new risks. Backups and disaster recovery operations are part of the process of restoring delivery mechanisms.

Frameworks 
Resilience, as defined by Presidential Policy Directive PPD-21, is the ability to prepare for and adapt to changing conditions and withstand and recover rapidly from disruptions. Cyber resilience focuses on the preventative, detective, and reactive controls in an information technology environment to assess gaps and drive enhancements to the overall security posture of the entity. The Cyber Resilience Review (CRR) is one framework for the assessment of an entity's resiliency created by the Department of Homeland Security. Another framework created by Symantec is based on 5 pillars: Prepare/Identify, Protect, Detect, Respond, and Recover.

The National Institute of Standards and Technology's Special Publication 800-160 Volume 2 Rev. 1 offers a framework for engineering secure and reliable systems—treating adverse cyber events as both resiliency and security issues. In particular 800-160 identifies fourteen techniques that can be used to improve resiliency:

See also 
 Critical infrastructure protection
 Decentralization
 Internet censorship
 Peer-to-peer
 Proactive cyber defense
 Resilience (organizational)

References

Computer security procedures
IT infrastructure
Cyberwarfare
Security
National security
Business continuity
Disaster preparedness